Anton "Toni" Petrea (born 9 March 1975) is a Romanian professional football manager and former player, currently in charge of Liga I club Chindia Târgoviște.

Coaching career

FCSB

On 15 July 2020, Petrea was appointed as the new head coach of Liga I side FCSB. He left the club on 25 May 2021.

On 15 November 2021, he returned to FCSB. On 25 July 2022, he resigned from his post.

Chindia Târgoviște
On 21 September 2022, it was announced he would manage another Liga I club Chindia Târgoviște.

Career statistics

Managerial statistics

Honours

Player
Snagov
Liga III: 2005–06, 2007–08

Coach
FCSB
Cupa României: 2019–20
Supercupa României runner-up: 2020

References

External links
 

1975 births
Living people
Sportspeople from Brăila
Romanian footballers
Association football midfielders
Liga I players
Liga II players
Liga III players
ASC Daco-Getica București players
Venus București players
AS Voința Snagov players
Romanian football managers
FC Steaua București assistant managers
FC Steaua București managers
AFC Chindia Târgoviște managers
Liga I managers